My Little Pony: Meet the Ponies is a collection of animated shorts produced by SD Entertainment and distributed by Hasbro. The animated shorts commemorate the 25th anniversary of the My Little Pony franchise and introduced the "Core 7" ponies. The shorts first became available online on Hasbro's official My Little Pony Website, before being released on DVD, Packaged within the first wave of the Core 7 Pony toys of the Generation 3 Line.

Plot
The animated shorts focus on the Core 7, a group of ponies who each have their own personalities and appearances. In each four-minute short, each of the ponies hosted their own party at their own house, expecting both good and bad situations to them.

Pinkie Pie's Party
Pinkie Pie got a bad daydream on how she will ruin her own party for her friends. As she woke up, she explained everything to Scootaloo about her dream. Scootaloo said that there is nothing to worry about and her party would go well as planned. At that Pinkie Pie went back to her house and do all the preparations for her party, she checks everything to see if she is doing right, only finding out her nightmare on preparing a party came true. Her friends came in and Pinkie Pie accepted their help: decorating the room, preparing the food and everything else. In the end, everything went well and Pinkie's party goes well as planned.

Rainbow Dash's Party
Pinkie Pie went to Rainbow Dash's home, only to see her that she got buried in a pile of clothes. She went inside her house and helped her up, also asking Rainbow Dash why is she inside her pile of clothes. She answered that she is getting ready for her dress up party happening in her house. As the others arrived, they all joined in her party. Rainbow Dash said she will host her own fashion show, with a special grand prize to be awarded to someone with the best clothing design. As the fashion show started, Cheerilee, Starsong, Toola-Roola, Scootaloo and Sweetie Belle showed off their awesome clothes they're wearing. In the end, Pinkie Pie and Rainbow Dash decided that they all win and got the grand prize.

Cheerilee's Party
Cheerilee has finished styling Pinkie Pie's mane and she likes how it turned out. Pinkie Pie asks if Cheerilee is ready for her own slumber party, responding yes seeing that everyone will help out. Later on, her slumber party began and she and her friends were having a lot of fun. As nighttime comes, everyone is still enjoying the party, listening to one of Cheerilee's spooky stories. But then, they hear something strange in the room and each one of them gets scared on what's making the strange noise. But it all turned to be a mouse hiding behind Starsong's tape recorder. In the end, their slumber party is a success, and they decide not to sleep and continue the party.

Scootaloo's Party
Scootaloo and Pinkie Pie are both taking a walk down the streets of Ponyville until Scootaloo decides she's hosting her own party, asking Pinkie Pie to help her. Pinkie Pie agrees as Scootaloo decides to throw an outdoor party for her friends. As they both think, Pinkie Pie feels dizzy on Scootaloo's doings and gets an idea, saying that Scootaloo should do an all activity outdoor party. As the party started, everyone in Ponyville competes in several athletic events. At the end of the competition, Scootaloo can't decide whom to give the award to, but decides that she wins and she gets the trophy. In the end, everyone is happy, especially Scootaloo.

Starsong's Party
Starsong is in the town square practicing her singing skills with Pinkie Pie hearing her sing gracefully. Their friends then go to see Starsong sing and admire her skills. Starsong states that she will have a karaoke party, but Sweetie Belle steps out, saying that she's gonna ruin the party. Cheerilee explains to Sweetie Belle about Starsong's singing talent and why she was like Sweetie Belle once, being shy about her singing skills. She also explains that Starsong once danced and sang inside her house until Pinkie Pie decided to host a sing and dance party. But since Starsong is shy, she cannot perform over an audience and Pinkie Pie encourages her to practice backstage until she lifted out the curtains. Everyone in Ponyville sees her sing and dance for the first time and they cheering on her skills as a performer. Starsong is surprised but also happy and everyone sang along with her. After hearing Cheerilee's story, Sweetie Belle decides to join in the party.

Toola-Roola's Party
Toola-Roola is decorating the table with plates until she hears the doorbell. Her friends came in and greeted her saying that they were all ready for Toola-Roola's art session as they were going to paint and decorate their own plates. Everyone started to decorate and paint their own plates as they use their imagination on the design they're using. After the art session, Toola-Roola said to her friends to put some placecards with their cutie marks on them so they can tell whose plate is whom as they leave and wait for the paint to dry. However, the wind blows the cards onto the floor and Toola-Roola can't figure out which plate belongs to which pony. Pinkie Pie comes in and sees the mess, and as Toola puts the placecards back to their respective plates with Pinkie's help, everyone comes back to see the plates so they can start the party, only they find out that the plates got mixed up. In the end, Toola-Roola learns to be more responsible next time and the ponies finally got to enjoy the cake, and their plates.

Sweetie Belle's Party
Cheerilee, Starsong, Rainbow Dash and Toola Roola are outside, doodling and thinking something about their dream cake for Sweetie Belle's party. As Pinkie Pie and Scootaloo greets them, they both learned about the cakes they're gonna bake and decided to join them, also telling them to show the designs to Sweetie Belle. At Sweetie Belle's house, she is having a hard time researching on her ideal cake until her friends show her their cake designs. However, everyone then goes to bake their own dream cake, with Sweetie Belle telling to them to follow some instructions, which they don't. After the cake is finally baked and taken out of the oven, Sweetie Belle takes a taste test on their cake, only finding out it wasn't done well and the taste isn't what they imagined. The ponies apologized to Sweetie Belle and they all agree to do another cake, this time following instructions on baking and decorating. In the end, they all learn that they need to follow instructions next time and as everyone is full and can't eat their cake, they still had fun making them.

Characters

Major characters

Pinkie Pie
Voiced by: Janyse Jaud
An earth pony with a pink body and a light pink mane and tail. Her cutie mark is three balloons (two blue ones and one yellow one). Pinkie Pie is the imaginative, friendly, fun-loving leader of the group who loves planning big parties and anything pink.

Rainbow Dash
Voiced by: Anna Cummer
An earth pony with a sky blue body and a pink, orange, yellow and green mane and tail navy blue, purple and pink. She has a rainbow on the clouds as her cutie mark. She is the stylish, trendy, shopaholic fashionista of the group who is described as the one who'd "always dress in style".

Starsong
Voiced by: Chantal Strand
A pegasus pony with a purple body and mane and tail in shades in pink. She also has gossamer-like wings on her back. Her cutie mark is a pink and white star. She is an expert performer, singer and dancer who is a bit shy at times, but blossoms on stage. Only pegasus in Ponyville.

Sweetie Belle
Voiced by: Andrea Libman
A unicorn pony with a white body whose mane and tail are colored pink, purple and light purple. Her cutie mark is a sparkly pink heart. She loves baking sweets and treats. Only unicorn in Ponyville.

Scootaloo
Voiced by: Tabitha St. Germain
An earth pony with an orange body and a purple and pink mane and tail. Her cutie mark is a butterfly with two small yellow flowers. Scootaloo loves playing games and sports.

Cheerilee
Voiced by: Kelly Sheridan
An earth pony with a mulberry body and a mane and tail in different shades of pink. Her cutie mark is a pink cherry blossom. Cheerilee loves flowers and telling amazing stories.

Toola-Roola
Voiced by: Erin Mathews
An earth pony with a cream colored body and dark pink, orange and yellow mane and light blue, navy blue and purple tail. Her cutie mark is a paintbrush and curly lines. Toola-Roola is a talented artist who enjoys painting pictures and making arts and crafts. She also loves finding inspirations everywhere, even in the most unusual spots.

Reception

External links

2008 direct-to-video films
American direct-to-video films
American children's animated fantasy films
My Little Pony serials
Animated anthology films
English-language Canadian films
2000s American animated films
Canadian direct-to-video films
Canadian animated feature films
2008 films
2000s English-language films
2000s Canadian films